OUBEY (1958–2004) was a visual artist.

Life and work 

OUBEY attended the University of Karlsruhe from 1979 to 1983, where he studied architecture. Parallel to his studies, he developed his early works at this time.

Inspired by Prof. Fritz Haller, who gained popularity by developing the modular furniture system USM Haller, OUBEY came into contact with visionary projects such as the planning of prototypical space colonies and the futuristic concept of a global city planning, named Integral Urban. The findings of these projects, along with his thinking, and his early-on interest for science, mathematics, philosophy, poetry, science fiction and arts form the mental background for OUBEYs artistic works.

Before attending university, OUBEY already had begun to study space exploration, Newtons, Einsteins and Heisenbergs works in physics, the metaphysics of Leibniz,  ancient  Greek science, philosophy and arts, the geometric and musical theory of harmony, the poetry of Rilke, Celan and Trakl, as well as science fiction literature from Stansilaw Lem to Perry Rhodan. While studying the scientific work of Ilya Prigogine and his pioneering discoveries about complexity, irreversibility, chaos, order, and entropy, OUBEY found confirmation of his holistic view of the world and the cosmos.

In 1983, OUBEY decided to live and work as a freelance artist.

From 1987 to 2001, he worked in the former studio of Markus Lüpertz, where he created, amongst other works, his avant-garde computer paintings on the Amiga 500. He called them “PhotonPaintings”, and presented them 1992 in his first and very successful sales exhibition. Soon thereafter, he decided to retreat from the public, in order to work on his art independently for an indefinite period of time, as free as possible, far from any outside influence, and to only make a comeback when he thought the right time to do so had come.

After moving to a new studio, OUBEY was able to consider a new public appearance for the first time again. When OUBEY died in a traffic accident in 2004, he was in the midst of preparing for this.

During the limited time spent on his artistry, OUBEY had created a multifaceted portfolio of works, which includes over 1200 pieces of art. Through the MINDKISS project, initiated and directed by OUBEYs partner Dagmar Woyde-Koehler, these works are now posthumously made accessible to the public, step by step.

Movies 

Further, the OUBEY Encounter film project plays its own role in the MINDKISS project, directed by OUBEYs partner, Dagmar Woyde-Koehler. Within the context of this project, she travels to various individuals, who are working professionally on the same subjects,  share some of the same interests, or try to answer the same questions as OUBEY, presenting to them an original piece of OUBEYs art. This spontaneous encounter with one of OUBEYs pictures is documented on film and later presented online. To date, 21 of these short films have already been released on YouTube, as well as the OUBEY website. They open up very special, uncommon perspectives and views to OUBEY and his art, unlike the judgement of a  traditional art expert. The following table shows an overview of the OUBEY Encounters.

Exhibitions 
From 2012, the Global Encounter-Tour presented more of OUBEYs originals to a bigger audience at various places.

First Stopover: October 2012“OUBEY - Visions: Through Art to science”. Symposium at the Goethe Institute, San Francisco in cooperation with the Academy of Arts University. Contributions by Dr. Seth Shostak, SETI Institute Mountain View/Nina McCurdy, University of Santa Cruz/Joe Betts-LaCroix, Health Salon Series San Francisco/Peter Erlenwein, author and sociologist.

Second Stopover: March 2013“The Joy of Insight”. Keynote by Prof. Peter Kruse at the Direktorenhaus in Berlin.

Third Stopover: November 2013“OUBEY – Art & Complexity”. OUBEY at Global Peter Drucker Forum 2013 in Vienna.

Fourth Stopover: March 2014

“An Element of the Universal”. OUBEY at Te Kura Kaupapa Maori O Nga Mokopuna Maori school in Seatoun/Wellington, Aotearoa New Zealand.

Sixth Stopover: May 2015

“OUBEY MINDKISS 5th Anniversary Happening”. OUBEY at the Center for Art and Media, Germany.

Seventh Stopover: December 2015

“Immediacy is Crucial”. OUBEY at the Nagandu International Academy of Art and Design (NIAAD) in Kampala, Uganda.

Publications 

 1992: Mindkiss – The Photopainting, catalogue, ed. by Atelier O.U.B.E.Y (dt. and engl.).
 2010: OUBEY Mindkiss, Deutscher Kunstverlag Berlin, ed. by Dagmar Woyde-Koehler, conception: Stefan Sagmeister, Dagmar Woyde-Koehler, .
 2011: OUBEY 2011, ed. by Engelhardt & Bauer, conception and design: MAGMA Design. 
 2012: we and the arts, ed. by we_magazine.
 2014: Wir haben uns erkannt, in: brand eins, No. 01/2014 Schwerpunkt: Originalität, p. 100 - 106.
 2014: Dagmar Woyde-Koehler - „Es geht darum, das Universum, vielleicht auch die vielen Universen, zu erforschen.“, by Raphael Rusitzka, May 13, 2014 on: Galore Interviews

Awards 
OUBEY Mindkiss
 2010 red dot Design Award
 2010 AIGA (American Institute of Graphic Arts) New York: 50 Books/50 Covers Award
 2010 Communication Art: Award of Excellence

OUBEY
 2011 Gregor Calendar Award: Hauptpreis Gregor Award
 2011 Type Directors Club New York: Certificate of Typographic Excellence

Literature

References

External links 
 Homepage

20th-century German painters
20th-century German male artists
German male painters
Karlsruhe Institute of Technology alumni
1958 births
2004 deaths
21st-century German painters
21st-century German male artists